Black Tide (1999) is a crime novel by Australian author Peter Temple.  This is the second novel in the author's Jack Irish series.

Dedication
"For Anita, Nicholas, and Louise: the Charity, the Hope, and the Faith."

Notes

This novel has also been published in USA (in 2005 by MacAdam/Cage), in Canada (in 2006 by Anchor Canada), in the UK (in 2008 by Quercus as part of Bad Debts: A Jack Irish Omnibus) and in the Netherlands, in a Dutch-language edition (in 2003 by De Boekerij) with a translation by Paul Witte.

Reviews

 "Australian Crime Fiction Database" 
 "Australian Public Intellectual Network" 

1999 Australian novels
Novels by Peter Temple
Novels set in Melbourne